is the southeastern portion of Gifu Prefecture in the Chūbu region of Japan. The Tōnō region received its name as a combination of the kanji for "east" (東) and "Mino" (美濃). The borders of this region are not officially set, but it generally consists of the following cities: Tajimi, Toki, Mizunami, Ena and Nakatsugawa. Occasionally, Kani, usually part of the Chūnō region, is also included as being part of Tōnō.

Geography
The Toki River forms the border between it and Nagano Prefecture to the east and Aichi Prefecture to the south. The Kiso River flows through the central area from east to west.

Population
As of 2008 the Tōnō region had about 358,000 residents, which was 17% of the prefecture's entire total.

Features
The Chūō Main Line, Japan National Route 19, and Chūō Expressway are the main traffic routes through the region. Because of this, compared with Gifu and other regions within the prefecture, it has better connections with places along Route 19 (formerly the ) like Nagoya and Kasugai and along Route 363 like Seto. To go to places like Seinō and the Gifu region it's often faster to go through Aichi Prefecture via  in Komaki or Nagoya Station. This is largely because the Takayama Main Line and Taita Line that run between Gifu Station and Tajimi Station are not electrified and have few trains with small numbers of cars. Additionally, the prefectural boundary makes a northward arc along the Kiso River.
In the Ritsuryō period, it formed one part of the Tōsandō, and generally was associated with Toki District and Ena District. In the Edo period it was generally divided into the Owari Domain (of the Owari-Tokugawa family), Iwamura Domain, and the Naegi Domain with the Nakasendō running through.
Toki, Tajimi, and Mizunami form a prominent Japanese pottery and porcelain producing region; the pottery is known as Mino ware.
Summer is hot and humid, and winter is cold, but snowfall is little. In recent years, Tajimi has been known for holding the hottest temperature record. On August 16, 2007, Tajimi set the record at the time for the hottest temperature in Japan along with Kumagaya, Saitama at 40.9 °C.
There are many basins formed by the Kiso River and Toki River water system, and many towns were built around their respective basins. Akechi, Kamiyahagi, and Kushihara in the south of Ena belong to the Yahagi River water system.

Transportation

Rail lines
 JR Central 
 Chūō Main Line
Chūō Shinkansen
 Taita Line
 Akechi Line
Closed lines
 (closed in 1935)
 (closed in 1944, then transferred to the Nagano regional forestry office's Sakashita field office, and finally closed in 1956)

Main roadways

 Chūō Expressway
 Tōkai-Kanjō Expressway

Bus companies

Gallery

See also
Seinō
Gifu
Chūnō
Hida
Hanbun, Aoi - NHK TV drama which ran in the first half of 2018. Set in the fictitious town of Fukuro, Higashimino, the main street of Iwamura in Ena was used as the main filming location. Other locations in Tōnō were also used as filming locations.

References

Chūbu region
Geography of Gifu Prefecture